Leucine-rich repeat-containing protein 8A is a protein that in humans is encoded by the LRRC8A gene. Researchers have found out that this protein, along with the other LRRC8 proteins LRRC8B, LRRC8C, LRRC8D, and LRRC8E, is a subunit of the heteromer protein volume-regulated anion channel (VRAC). (VRACs) are crucial to the regulation of cell size by transporting chloride ions and various organic osmolytes, such as taurine or glutamate, across the plasma membrane, and that is not the only function these channels have been linked to.

While LRRC8A is one of many proteins that can be part of VRAC, it is the most important subunit for the channel’s ability to function.  However, while we know it is necessary for VRAC function, other studies have found that it is not sufficient for the full range of usual VRAC activity. This is where the other LRRC8 proteins come in, as the different composition of these subunits affects the range of specificity for VRACs.

The transmembrane portion of LRRC8 proteins are similar to those in Pannexins. LRRC8A alone can form a hexameric VRAC, for which the cyro-EM structure has been determined in its mice and human versions.

In addition to its role in VRACs, the LRRC8 protein family is also associated with agammaglobulinemia-5.

References

Further reading 

 
 
 
 
 
 
 

LRR proteins